Blazhko is a lunar impact crater that is located in the northern hemisphere on the far side of the Moon. It lies to the northwest of the crater Joule, and to the south of Gadomski.  The fresh, bright crater Wargo is to the south.

The rim of this crater is generally circular, but with some irregularities. There is a small outward bulge in the rim to the east-southeast, and an inward bulge on the opposite face. There is also a slight outward bulge along the north rim. The satellite crater Blazhko F is attached to the exterior of the east rim. The inner wall along the northeast face is striated with terraces. The interior floor is relatively level.

Satellite craters
By convention these features are identified on lunar maps by placing the letter on the side of the crater midpoint that is closest to Blazkho.

References

 
 
 
 
 
 
 
 
 
 
 
 

Impact craters on the Moon